Konstantine Kupatadze (born 28 April 1983) is a boxer from Georgia.

He participated in the 2004 Summer Olympics. There he was stopped in the second round of the featherweight (57 kg) division by North Korea's eventual runner-up Kim Song-Guk.

Kupatadze won bronze medals in the same division at the 2002 European Amateur Boxing Championships and the 2004 European Amateur Boxing Championships.

External links
Yahoo! Sports

1983 births
Living people
Male boxers from Georgia (country)
Featherweight boxers
Boxers at the 2004 Summer Olympics
Olympic boxers of Georgia (country)
21st-century people from Georgia (country)